Apucarana Atlético Clube, usually known simply as Apucarana, is a Brazilian football team from the city of Apucarana, Paraná state, founded in 1975.

Apucarana Atlético Clube was member of Campeonato Paranaense by 1997.

Honour
Campeonato Paranaense second division : 1977, 1984

References

 History of Apucarana Atlético Clube

Association football clubs established in 1975
Football clubs in Paraná (state)
1975 establishments in Brazil